Tobias Kammerlander (born 25 March 1986) is an Austrian Nordic combined skier who has competed since 2003. His best World Cup finish was third in a 4 x 5 km team event in Germany in January 2010 while his best individual finish was 17th twice (Germany in 2008 and Italy in 2009).

References

1986 births
Austrian male Nordic combined skiers
Living people
Place of birth missing (living people)